Faithful+Gould (pronounced "Faithful and Gould" or "F and G") is an integrated project and programme management consultancy. It supports clients with the management of their construction projects and programmes. It is part of Atkins – a design, engineering and project management consultancy.

History
The company was established by Eric Faithful and Leonard Gould in 1947 as they worked together to repair Bristol after it was heavily bombed in the Second World War. It subsequently worked with Imperial Chemical Industries to provide cost valuation and management services across the UK and with the National Coal Board to develop Selby Coalfield. The company became part of Atkins in 1996. It subsequently expanded organically and through a series of acquisitions including Silk & Frazier in 1998, Yeoman & Edwards in 1999 and Hanscomb in 2002.

In 2012 Simon Burns, the Minister for Transport, admitted in Parliament that it had been Faithful+Gould who had been responsible for the franchising policy design for the InterCity West Coast franchise competition which was abandoned. The Laidlaw Inquiry made no criticism of the firm's conduct.

The company went on to buy Confluence, a project management business, in 2013.

Operations
Faithful+Gould employs over 2,000 staff and has an expanding office base worldwide.

References

External links

Business services companies of the United Kingdom
Construction and civil engineering companies of the United Kingdom
Consulting firms established in 1947
1947 establishments in England
Construction and civil engineering companies established in 1947
British companies established in 1947
Multinational companies headquartered in England
Privately held companies of England